Vengeance Is Mine is the fourth solo studio album released by rapper X-Raided. It was released on November 21, 2000, through Blackmarket Records and was produced by Big Hollis and KG. This album fulfilled X-Raided's contract with Black Market Records, the label he helped get off the ground with his 1992 debut Psycho Active. He left the label after Vengeance and started his own label, Mad Man Records.

Track listing

Personnel

X-Raided – vocals, executive producer
Big Hollis – producer (tracks 2, 5, 6, 7, 8, 9, 14, 15)
KG – producer (tracks 3, 4, 10, 11, 12, 13)
The VerbalTek – producer (track 1)
Cedric Singleton – executive producer, album layout & photography
Seasone Zachary – marketing/"Media Assassin"
Deon "Big Pook Loc" Hurts – executive producer, management
Phantom – album design & artwork
Pete Harned – X-Raided chief legal counsel
Clyde A. Polk – BMR product management

References

2000 albums
X-Raided albums
Albums produced by Big Hollis